Sabeena Rafi (6 October 1918 – 22 June 1990) was an Indian essayist and historian of Malayalam literature. Her oeuvre consists of philosophical works, an autobiography and Chavittu Nadakam - Oru Charithra Padanam, the first historical compendium on Chavittu Nadakam, an operatic dance form. Her book, Kaliyugam, a philosophical work jointly written with her husband, Ponjikkara Rafi, fetched her the Kerala Sahitya Akademi Award for Miscellaneous Works in 1972.

Biography 
Sabeena was born on 6 October 1918 at Gothuruth, a small village in the periphery of present day Ernakulam district of the south Indian state of Kerala to Joseph and Mariamma. She earned two master's degrees, in History and Economics, and served our her career as a teacher. She married Ponjikkara Rafi in 1963, following a period of romance, but the couple did not have children. She died on 22 June 1990, at the age of 65; survived by Rafi, who died two years later, on 6 September 1992.

Legacy and honours 
Sabeen Rafi's oeuvre consists of five non-fiction works and Chritumas Sammanam, her autobiography. Chavittu Nadakam - Oru Charithra Padanam, her 1964 publication on the history of Chavittu Nadakam, an operatic dance form originated in Ernakulam, is considered to be the first comprehensive book on the subject. Marxism, Oru Thirinjunottam, a book co-written with her husband, is a detailed study of the Marxian theory and its spiritual aspects; the book also has a critique on Mother of Maxim Gorky. Kaliyugam, again a Ponjikkara Rafi co-written work, is a study of human behaviour from early ages, with a philosophical perspective. The book fetched her the Kerala Sahitya Akademi Award for Miscellaneous Works in 1972.

Bibliography

See also 

 List of Malayalam-language authors by category
 List of Malayalam-language authors

References

External links 
 
 

1924 births
1990 deaths
Writers from Kerala
People from Ernakulam district
20th-century Indian non-fiction writers
20th-century Indian essayists
Recipients of the Kerala Sahitya Akademi Award
Women writers from Kerala
20th-century Indian women writers
20th-century Indian historians
Malayalam-language writers